State Route 367 (SR 367), also known as College Street, is a short  north-south state highway located entirely in the city of Trenton, Tennessee.

Route description

SR 367 begins at an intersection with US 45W/SR 5 (Highway 45 Bypass S/College Street) and SR 457. It heads north through neighborhoods for a couple of miles, where it has an intersection with SR 54 (Armory Street), before entering downtown and coming to an intersection with SR 104 (Eaton Street). The highway then winds around the Gibson County Courthouse  traffic circle before continuing north to leave downtown and cross the North Fork of the Forked Deer River. SR 367 has a Y-intersection with Halliburton Street (former SR 54) before turning northwest through more rural areas before coming to an end at an intersection with US 45W/SR 5/SR 77. The entire route of SR 367 is a two-lane highway.

History

The entire route of SR 367 follows the former route of US 45W/SR 5 through downtown Trenton. At one point, it was also designated and signed as U.S. Route 45W Business (US 45W Business), with SR 367 being that highway’s unsigned companion route. That highway has since been decommissioned with the road being resigned solely as SR 367.

Major intersections

References

367
Transportation in Gibson County, Tennessee
U.S. Route 45